The 2021–22 season was the 91st season in the existence of CA Osasuna and the club's third consecutive season in the top flight of Spanish football. In addition to the domestic league, Osasuna participated in this season's edition of the Copa del Rey.

Players

First-team squad

Reserve team

Out on loan

Transfers

In

Out

Pre-season and friendlies

Competitions

Overall record

La Liga

League table

Results summary

Results by round

Matches
The league fixtures were announced on 30 June 2021.

Copa del Rey

Statistics

Appearances and goals
Last updated 22 May 2022

|-
! colspan=14 style=background:#dcdcdc; text-align:center|Goalkeepers

|-
! colspan=14 style=background:#dcdcdc; text-align:center|Defenders

|-
! colspan=14 style=background:#dcdcdc; text-align:center|Midfielders

|-
! colspan=14 style=background:#dcdcdc; text-align:center|Forwards

|-
! colspan=14 style=background:#dcdcdc; text-align:center| Players who have made an appearance or had a squad number this season but have been loaned out or transferred

|}

Goalscorers

References

CA Osasuna seasons
CA Osasuna